Gençtavuş is a village in the Solhan District, Bingöl Province, Turkey. The village is populated by Kurds of the Tavz tribe and had a population of 399 in 2021.

The hamlets of Abaklı, Akbük, Alaca, Armuş, Bardaklı, Beşikli, Çalı, Değirmenderesi, Kuştepe, Küllüce, Örencik, Taş, Ünlüce and Yuva are attached to the village.

References 

Villages in Solhan District
Kurdish settlements in Bingöl Province